Frida Blumenberg (May 24, 1935) is a visual artist and sculptor working primarily in neon, acrylic, and bronze.

Born in Durban, South Africa to Swedish parents, she was educated as a sculptor, painter, and goldsmith in London, where she had several solo exhibitions at the Institute of Contemporary Art. In 1960 at the age of 25, she completed a mosaic mural for the Durban Maritime Terminal that, at the time, was the largest mosaic mural in the Southern hemisphere. In 1965, she was one of six artist-jewelers who represented Great Britain in the Bavarian Government Special Show in Munich, Germany in the exhibition titled "Jewelry as Sculpture."  Her work has been exhibited in museums and galleries in England, Canada, Ireland, Germany, the Netherlands, South Africa, and in America at the Institute of Contemporary Art (Boston), the National Museum of Women in the Arts (Washington, D.C.), the Denver Art Museum, the Dallas Museum of Art, and the Houston Museum of Art, among others. In group exhibitions, she has shown with Picasso, Alexander Calder, and Louise Nevelson. Her work is also featured in many corporate collections including those of Shell, Alcon/Nestlé, Canadian Pacific Railways, and Texas American Banks. She is considered among the premier artists working internationally in neon and in acrylic, and she has combined a postmodern sensibility for the elements of industrial art, like neon, with a classic sense of design and artistry.

References
 Turner, Ralph. Contemporary Jewelry: A Critical Assessment 1945 to 1975. (Van Nostrand Reinhold, 1976).
 Cutner, Janet. "Five Artists, Four Shows, Three Dimensions." Art News Vol. 76 No. 3 (March 1977).

1935 births
Living people
South African sculptors
Neon artists
20th-century South African women artists
21st-century South African women artists
South African people of Swedish descent